Ansonia inthanon is a species of toad in the family Bufonidae.

A small stream toad, measuring only 22-26mm in length.  Its natural habitat is near torrents in subtropical forest on sloping land.  It is threatened by habitat loss for agriculture, use by medical research (although this is not a significant threat) and by the introduced American bullfrog.  Though it is only known from Doi Inthanon National Park and Thongphaphum in Kanchanaburi Province, it is not rare in suitable habitat.  The species was recently discovered in a third locality, Doi Suthep National Park in Chiang Mai Province, and may also exist in similar habitat in northern Thailand and adjacent Myanmar.

References

Sources
 
 
 

inthanon
Frogs of Asia
Amphibians of Thailand
Endemic fauna of Thailand
Amphibians described in 1998
Taxa named by Masafumi Matsui
Taxonomy articles created by Polbot